Linda Siegel (June 5, 1961) is a retired professional tennis player from the United States who played in the Grand Slam tournaments in the 1970s and 1980s.

Tennis career
Linda Siegel defeated  Ivanna Madruga, 6–4, 6–4 to win US Open girls' singles champions in 1978. In the same year she lost in the final of  South African Open women's singles championship.

References

External links
 

Living people
1961 births
US Open (tennis) junior champions
Grand Slam (tennis) champions in girls' singles
American female tennis players
21st-century American women